The Dance Chimes is a foot-operated chime-like musical instrument that consists of 9 bronze tiles, with mechanical sound elements under each.

Description
The 9 bronze tiles of the Dance Chimes are arranged in a square formation and usually in-built in the ground. The sound pads are triggered by sensitive hammers activated while hopping, jumping or dancing. The tone is bell-like and the notes are tuned in a pentatonic sequence and can be played note by note to play a melody, or sounded together to play a chord.

History
Invented and designed by Alfons van Leggelo in the 1970s, the Dance Chimes was created to relate the movement of walking directly with sound. The instrument, made of bronze is related to the physical properties of the carillon. The name 'Dance Chimes' comes from the movement to ‘dance’, a connection between movement and sound experience, and ‘chimes’, the instrument most similar in material and sound.
Dance Chimes have been installed in public places worldwide, including Battery Park, Citygarden, Diana, Princess of Wales Memorial Playground, Museumplein, Amsterdam and also schools for mentally/physically handicapped children.

Technical Details

The left panel shows the tuning of the dance chimes. The middle panel shows the corresponding nine tones under the nine tiles numbered 1 through 9. The right panel shows the path from the lowest (b') to the highest (f"').

See also
 Chime (bell instrument)

References

External links
 YouTube video: The Stompstone Song
 Dance Chimes information sheet
 Dance Chimes Technical Details (English)
 Dance Chimes Technical Details (German)
 Alfons van Leggelo

Manufacturers
 Richter Spielgeräte - English
 Richter Spielgeräte - German

Distributors
 Goric

European percussion instruments
Idiophones
1976 musical instruments
Dutch musical instruments